Osinsky District (Ohyn aimag) is an administrative district of Ust-Orda Buryat Okrug of Irkutsk Oblast, Russia, one of the thirty-three in the oblast. Municipally, it is incorporated as Osinsky Municipal District. It is located in the south of the oblast. Its administrative center is the rural locality (a selo) of Osa. Population:  20,962 (2002 Census);  The population of Osa accounts for 22.1% of the district's total population.

References

Notes

Sources

Registry of the Administrative-Territorial Formations of Irkutsk Oblast 

Districts of Irkutsk Oblast